Oil and Gold (1985) is the fourth full-length album by English musical group Shriekback, released on Arista Records in UK and Europe, Australia and New Zealand and on Island Records in the United States,

The album is widely considered the band's highest creative moment and saw them begin a metamorphosis from funk-influenced New Wave towards darker and challenging art rock. The addition of Martyn Barker on drums and Lu Edmonds on guitar gives many of the songs a harder edge, while the album also features synthesizers from Hans Zimmer, best known for his work in film music.

Oil & Gold served as a bridge between the founding trio of Barry Andrews, Carl Marsh, and Dave Allen, and a span of releases spearheaded by Andrews alone.  Marsh, whose voice featured prominently on earlier releases, left the band after the recording and Andrews took over as primary vocalist. Marsh would return with the release of Having A Moment, and remains involved with the band to the present day.  Still, the album's highlights, including the three opening songs, sung by Marsh, and the minor hit, "Nemesis", became the band's signature song. The album's success widened their audience significantly, and sold well in the U.S. Both of the singles released from the album reached the Top 100 in the UK singles chart: "Nemesis" reached number 94 and "Fish Below The Ice" reached number 88.

In other media

Two songs from the album, "This Big Hush" and "Coelocanth", were featured in Michael Mann's 1986 film Manhunter.  "Coelocanth" was also featured in the Canadian science fiction film, Come True.  "Faded Flowers" was featured in Band of the Hand. "This Big Hush" was also used in season 6 episode 7 of Nip/Tuck. The song "Everything That Rises Must Converge" refers to the short story of that name by Flannery O'Connor. The video for the song "Nemesis" features the 2000 AD character Nemesis the Warlock.

Track listing

All songs written by Dave Allen, Barry Andrews, Martyn Barker and Carl Marsh.

"Malaria"  – 4:29
"Everything That Rises Must Converge"  – 4:03
"Fish Below the Ice"  – 4:24
"This Big Hush"  – 6:11
"Faded Flowers"  – 3:44
"Nemesis"  – 3:43
"Only Thing That Shines"  – 4:23
"Health and Knowledge and Wealth and Power"  – 4:44
"Hammerheads"  – 4:17
"Coelocanth"  – 4:13

2011 bonus disc

"Suck" (BBC Live at Hatfield Polytechnic 1984)
"Mothloop" (BBC Live at Hatfield Polytechnic 1984)
"Feelers" (BBC Live at Hatfield Polytechnic 1984)
"Nemesis" (Extended Mix)
"Nemesis" (Arch Deviant Mix)
"Fish Below Ice" (7" Edit)
"Lined Up"
"My Spine (Is the Bassline)"
"Fish Below Ice" (Plankton Enriched Mix)
"Fish Below Ice" (Dance Mix)

Personnel
Barry Andrews - keyboards, synthesizers, vocals
Carl Marsh - guitars, vocals
Dave Allen - bass
Martyn Barker - drums
Lu Edmonds - guitar
Hans Zimmer - engineering/complicated shaker on "This Big Hush"
Ian Caple- engineer

References

External links
 
Oil and Gold on band's website

1985 albums
Shriekback albums
Island Records albums
Arista Records albums